Steven, Stephen, or Steve O'Brien may refer to:
 Steven O'Brien (pilot), Minnesota Air National Guard pilot who witnessed the 9/11 attack flights
 Steven O'Brien (dual player) (born 1994), Tipperary Gaelic football and hurling player
 Steven O'Brien (Cork Gaelic footballer) (born 1969), Irish Gaelic footballer
 Stephen O'Brien (born 1957), British politician and diplomat
 Stephen J. O'Brien (born 1944), American geneticist
 Stephen O'Brien (musician), member of HAL, an Irish band
 Stephen O'Brien (Kerry Gaelic footballer) (born 1991), Irish sportsperson